Chromium acetate may refer to:

 Chromium(II) acetate
 Chromium(III) acetate

Chromium compounds
Acetates